Forms of address used in the Commonwealth of Australia are given below.

Forms of Address

References

Honorifics by country
Australian culture